Justine Bruno is a French swimmer who competes in the Women's 100 metre butterfly. At the 2012 Summer Olympics she finished 38th overall in the heats in the Women's 100 metre butterfly and failed to reach the final.

References

1994 births
Sportspeople from Beauvais
Living people
Olympic swimmers of France
Swimmers at the 2012 Summer Olympics
French female butterfly swimmers
20th-century French women
21st-century French women